Suspilne Kultura is a Ukrainian public TV channel showcasing culture in Ukraine, operated by the Public Broadcasting Company of Ukraine.

History 

The State Television and Radio Broadcasting Company “Culture” emerged in Ukraine in 2002 as part of the State Committee of Television and Radio of Ukraine. It was first broadcast on the First National and Second National channels. In November, 2004 STRBC “Culture” was granted a license from the National television and broadcasting Council of Ukraine permitting it round-the-clock satellite broadcasting for a period of ten years.

From September, 2005 STRBC “Culture” broadcasts over the cable network of Kyiv and the regions of Ukraine, and since May 2006 broadcasts via satellite to more than 80 countries.

Content of the broadcast 

 Language of broadcasting (as a percentage ratio): Ukrainian 100%;
 Own production share:  12 hours per day  (50%);
 Minimum share of national audiovisual product (own production as well):  21 hours 36 minutes per day (90%);
 Maximum share of foreign audiovisual product: 2 hours 24 minutes per day (10%);
 Theme: culture.

Genre distribution

Analysis 
 News of Culture. Cultural and art life of Ukraine: premieres, exhibitions, book presentations, museum news, art events, etc. Coverage of state processes, consolidation of society, European integration.
 Milestones of our history. Programs about outstanding cultural, political and public events and people of the past.

Culture and art 
 Open soul — about contemporary Ukrainians (including Ukrainian Diaspora) - people of different professions, masters of their work, living not only for themselves...
 In the artist's studio. Acquaintance with the modern Ukrainian artists
 Cinema addict — news about native non-commercial movies. History of Ukrainian cinema of the late 20th and early 21st century
 Theater stories — Ukrainian theater, past and current
 Literature mosaic — featuring works of writers and poets
 Photo — art critics talk about photographs as a phenomenon of scientific and technical progress

Science and education 
 Outstanding Ukrainians — notable artists, writers, scientists, patrons, government and public figures
 Memory guard — stories about museums, archives and libraries of Ukraine
 Temple — history and revival of monasteries, temples and religious schools. Sacred art as an inseparable component of the national cultural treasure
 Dialog — famous writers, artists, scientists, politicians about modern state of culture
 Our land — towns and villages of Ukraine. History and present. Architecture, culture and nature.

Entertainment and music 
 Philharmonic evenings — classical music concerts
 Artist — portraits of artists: musicians, singers, performers, dancers
 Music kaleidoscope — festivals, contests, concerts, artists. Meetings with performers and composers

Programs for children 
 Rainbow — youth achievements in the creative and educational field. Children mastering folk crafts and cultural traditions. Children with unique abilities. Homeless children, orphanage.
 Youth and time — young creative talents, modern culture and rising to prominence experience

Address 
State television and radio broadcasting company “Culture”
Ukraine, 02660, Kyiv, Melnykova str., 42.

Notes

External links
 Official website

Television stations in Ukraine
Ukrainian-language television stations in Ukraine
Television channels and stations established in 2003
Publicly funded broadcasters